Love Story is a 2005 Indian Kannada-language romantic drama film directed by Bharathi Kannan. The film stars Mayur Patel, Tanu Roy and Srinagara Kitty. The film was released in Tamil as Uyir Ullavare. This film is a remake of Maro Charitra (1978).

Cast 
Mayur Patel as Ram
Tanu Roy as Swapna
Srinagara Kitty
Komal
Ramesh Bhat
Chitra Shenoy 
Pramila Joshai
Nizhalgal Ravi
Livingston
Vindhya

Soundtrack 
The music composed by S. A. Rajkumar with lyrics by K. Kalyan. The songs were reused the tunes from the original.

Reception 
K. N. Venkatasubba Rao of The Hindu wrote that "Though Mayur Patel has given his best as the hero, it is Srinagar Kitty as the villain who succeeds in registering his histrionic potential on a par with those artistes who played that role in original Telugu and Hindi films". R. G. Vjayasarathy of Rediff.com said that "Being a faithful adaptation, some sequences of the film are well-narrated. But if outstanding performances were one of the main features of the original, except for a few artists like Mayur Patel, Komal and Pramila Joshai, the others fail to deliver in this remake". A critic from Viggy said that "If you watch Love Story without comparing it with its original (Kamal's performance or Balachandar's direction), you surely will enjoy the film and those melodious songs".

References

Kannada remakes of Telugu films
2000s Kannada-language films
Films directed by Bharathi Kannan